Saumik Dey  (born 18 October 1984) is an Indian footballer who plays as a left-back for East Bengal. He captained the club to the victories in the 32nd Federation Cup and the Calcutta Football League in 2010.

International
Saumik made his senior national team debut against Nepal on 12 March 2015.

References

External links
 Saumik Dey - Goal.com profile

Indian footballers
1984 births
Living people
Footballers from West Bengal
East Bengal Club players
I-League players
Kerala Blasters FC players
Indian Super League players
People from Hooghly district
India international footballers
Association football defenders
Tollygunge Agragami FC players